The .MAP file extension is used for various different types of files.

Other uses

 Debugging maps. These are typically plain text files that indicate the relative offsets of functions for a given version of a compiled binary.
 .map files are used on the site Azgaar's Fantasy Map Generator.
 .map files are also used by the MapInfo Professional geographic information system.
 .MAPs are also identified as color maps. An example of such software that supports .map files is SoundSpectrum's G-Force music visualizer.
 Another form of the .MAP file is for HTML image maps. An image map is formatted in HTML and creates click-able areas over a provided image.
More generically, the .MAP extension can be used to denote any file type that indicates relative offsets from a starting point. MAP file types are used in this way, for example, when variables in software are expected to be "mapped" to a specific spot in memory.